Herbert S. Auerbach (October 4, 1882 – March 19, 1945) was a prominent Jewish businessman in Salt Lake City and also a member of the Utah House of Representatives.

Early life and education 
Auerbach was born on October 4, 1882 in Salt Lake City, where his father ran a department store.  At age 15 he went to Germany to study at J. J. Meier School in Wiesbaden, then Lausanne, Switzerland. He then went to Columbia University where he received a degree in metallurgy in 1906.

Career 
He spent the next five years working with mines in Colorado, but from 1911 on spent his time running the family department store in Salt Lake City.

Auerbach also served as a member of the University of Utah board of regents, a major in the Ordnance Section of the United States Army during World War I, and a member of the Utah State Legislature from 1925–1929.

Auerbach also pursued studies in Utah history and was a poet and songwriter.

Death and legacy 
Auerbach died on March 19, 1945.

Although a Jew, his funeral was held at the Salt Lake Assembly Hall of the Church of Jesus Christ of Latter-day Saints with Frank W. Asper as organist and Jessie Evans Smith singing at least one solo.

Sources

bio of Auerbach

External links
Herbert S. Auerbach Collection on Mormons and Indians at Princeton University

1882 births
1945 deaths
United States Army personnel of World War I
Jewish American state legislators in Utah
Businesspeople from Salt Lake City
Columbia School of Engineering and Applied Science alumni
Members of the Utah House of Representatives
Politicians from Salt Lake City
University of Utah people
People of Utah Territory
20th-century American politicians
20th-century American businesspeople
United States Army officers